This is a list of all the United States Supreme Court cases from volume 413 of the United States Reports:

External links  

1973 in United States case law